Iron Man is an action-adventure video game based on the 2008 movie of the same name as well as the classic iterations of the character. It was released on May 2, 2008 to coincide with the release of the movie in cinemas. The game was published by Sega, and it was for Nintendo DS, PlayStation 2, PlayStation 3, Wii, Xbox 360, PlayStation Portable, and Microsoft Windows.

The enemies are Advanced Idea Mechanics, the Maggia and the Ten Rings terrorist group. The supervillains in the game includes Blacklash, Controller, Titanium Man, Melter, and Iron Monger.

A significant feature has Robert Downey Jr. (only as Tony Stark), Terrence Howard and Shaun Toub reprising their roles from the movie.

Plot
During a business trip to Afghanistan to demonstrate Stark Industries' new weapon, Tony Stark is suddenly kidnapped by the terrorist group gang Ten Rings, ordering him to build a missile for them. Instead, he and fellow captive Yinsen secretly build a powered suit of armor. During this time, Yinsen also acts as Stark's mentor, showing him humility and telling him of the horrors his company has caused, making Stark reconsider his life. Armed with a flamethrower and missiles, Stark uses the armor to destroy the terrorists' weapons stockpile and escape their camp, but Yinsen is killed, and the armor is destroyed. Upon being picked up by the Air Force and returning to the United States, Stark declares that his company will no longer manufacture weapons, a move disapproved by his business partner Obadiah Stane.

With the help of his personal A.I. J.A.R.V.I.S., Stark develops an updated and more powerful version of his armor, adding Stark Industries' new repulsor technology and flight capability. While testing his new suit at Stark Industries, Tony uses it to fend off an attack by the Maggia crime family, who have been providing weapons for the Ten Rings. Using his new Mark III "Iron Man" armor, Stark destroys the Maggia's weapons stockpiles and an armored hovercraft. On the way home, he establishes contact with his friend Lieutenant Colonel James Rhodes and reveals his identity as Iron Man.

Tony after these events goes back to his place, where Pepper Potts realizes what he has been doing. Rhodes also agrees to assists Stark with these desires, informing him of a weapons transport in Afghanistan. Stark follows the transport, destroying the weapons, defeating the villain Blacklash, a former Stark Industries worker, in the process, before proceeding to the Maggia's compound to destroy the rest of the weapons, and after infiltrating the mansion, he confronts Madame Masque, who is killed when a wall falls on her. Stark soon destroys the Maggia's flying fortress, ending this threat.

Meanwhile, Stane secretly recovers the first Iron Man armor in Afghanistan and starts working with the company Advanced Idea Mechanics (A.I.M.), Stark Industries' former top buyers, to create a power source. After A.I.M. attacks a nuclear facility in Russia, Iron Man foils them and also defeats Boris Bullski, who created a titanium armor similar to Tony's, thus becoming the "Titanium Man." Stark then thwarts A.I.M.'s attack on a military ship in the Arctic and defeats the Controller.

After returning to Stark Industries, Tony fights off an attack by A.I.M. forces under the command of Titanium Man, who was actually sent by Stane to steal the Iron Man suit. After discovering Stane's involvement with A.I.M. and the Ten Rings, Tony is ambushed by Stane, who steals his arc reactor to create a power source for his own armor. Stark is rescued by Rhodey and learns that A.I.M. has kidnapped Pepper to use her as bait. He then uses his armor to save Pepper from an A.I.M. facility and prevents the explosion of their reactor. Stark decides that A.I.M. is a bigger menace than Stane and decides to confront them first. He heads to their island and destroys their proton cannon before defeating the Melter and destroying A.I.M.'s space tether, ending their menace.

Stark then returns home and battles Stane, who has donned the "Iron Monger" suit. As the battle reaches the top of Stark Industries, Stark orders Pepper to overload the arc reactor at the building. The plan works, and Stane is killed. With all the villains gone, Tony Stark decides to continue helping mankind as Iron Man.

Reception

The Nintendo DS version received mixed reviews and the Wii, PS2 and PSP versions received generally unfavorable reviews on GameRankings and Metacritic. These versions suffer from gameplay, graphics and controls frustrations. The UK-based Official Nintendo Magazine rated the Wii version of Iron Man 15%, one of their lowest rating to date.

The Xbox 360 version received an average score of 46% on GameRankings and Metacritic, and the PS3 version received an average score of 43%. These versions were critically panned for the same things as the other versions of the game, with Eurogamer awarding it 3/10 and IGN 3.8/10. It was honored and awarded "Worst Game Everyone Played" by GameSpot in their 2008 video game awards.

Sales
Iron Man sold 2.6 million copies as of March 2009.

Sequel
A sequel game, Iron Man 2 was written by Iron Man comic book writer Matt Fraction, and was loosely based on the film Iron Man 2. The game was released on May 4, 2010. And also Iron Man 3: The Official Game, released in 2013.

Notes

References

External links
 Official game website
 

2008 video games
Action video games
Video games based on Iron Man
Nintendo DS games
PlayStation 2 games
PlayStation 3 games
PlayStation Portable games
Sega video games
Marvel Cinematic Universe video games
Video games based on films
Video games based on adaptations
Video games developed in Canada
Video games developed in the United States
Video games scored by Mark Griskey
Video games set in Afghanistan
Video games set in the Arctic
Video games set in Los Angeles
Video games set in Russia
Wii games
Windows games
Xbox 360 games
Behaviour Interactive games
Superhero video games
Iron Man (film series)